The Piauitinga River is a river in Sergipe state in northeastern Brazil.

See also
List of rivers of Sergipe

References
Brazilian Ministry of Transport

Rivers of Sergipe